Greg Han is the self-titled debut studio album by Taiwanese singer Greg Han. It was released on December 7, 2021, through Pourquoi Pas Music.

Release and promotion
Greg Han was released on December 7, 2021 to digital music. The CD was released on December 17, 2021.

Singles
"Yesterday No More", Greg Han's debut single, was released on October 27, 2020. Its music video premiered on November 17, 2020. It was directed by DJ Chen and stars Ivy Yin, Greg Han and Hsu Huachien.

"Soufflé" was released as the second single on November 5, 2021, along with its music video, directed by Han-soul.

The third single, "I Couldn't Care Less", was released on November 19, 2021. Its music video was released on November 23, directed by Kidding Hsu.

The fourth single, "One Day at a Time", was released alongside the album on December 7, 2021. The song's music video premiered on the same day at noon. It was directed by Remii Huang and stars Greg Han, Bai Runyi and Derek Chang.

The fifth single, "Good Night, Good Night", featuring Joanna Wang, received a music video on December 29, 2021, directed by Kao Chengkai. The song received Top 50 Singles of the Year at the 15th Freshmusic Awards.

Accolades

Track listing
Credits adapted from the album's liner notes.

Personnel
Credits adapted from the album's liner notes.

Musicians

 LINION – vocal production 
 YELLOW – vocal production , backing vocals 
 George Chen – vocal production 
 William Wei – vocal production 
 Huang Shaoyong – arrangement 
 Chung Weiyu – arrangement 
 JerryC – arrangement , guitar 
 Peter Wang – arrangement 
 Dato Chang – arrangement , piano , synthesizer , strings arrangement , strings production 
 Keke Ke – arrangement 
 Sun Linchien – arrangement , strings arrangement 
 Martin Tang – arrangement 
 The crane – arrangement , synthesizer , piano , drums , backing vocals arrangement , backing vocals 
 Ninewoods Lee – arrangement 
 Déjà Fu – arrangement 
 Eddie Hsu – strings production  
 Yaya Wu – executive production , backing vocals arrangement 
 Lu Kangyu – guitar 
 Wico Weng – guitar 
 Sugar Cube – guitar 
 Theo Chou – guitar 
 Chen Yuxi – guitar 
 Yin Yang – guitar 
 Arthur Shen – guitar 
 Howe Chen – guitar 
 Jack Ko – bass , synthesizer 
 Vincent Chen – bass 
 Peter Lai – drums 
 Chiang Shangchien – drums 
 Giant Art – quartet 
 Shuon Tsai – violin 
 Nala Huang – violin 
 Edric Chang – violin 
 Leta Chin – violin 
 Boy Chen – violin 
 Lu Szuchien – violin 
 Karla Huang – violin 
 Victor Yen – violin 
 Evelyn Chang – violin 
 Li Shaohsuan – violin 
 Weapon Gan – viola 
 Yuan Yiching – viola 
 Kelly Chen – viola 
 Wu Huichi – viola 
 Hang Liu – cello 
 Yoyo Wu – cello  
 Chiang Yuting – cello  
 Huang Yingyuan – cello 
 Greg Han – lead vocals , backing vocals 
 Joanna Wang – featured artist , vocals , backing vocals 
 Brandy Tien – backing vocals arrangement , backing vocals 
 HUSH – backing vocals arrangement , backing vocals 
 Osean – backing vocals arrangement , backing vocals 
 A'da Liang – backing vocals arrangement , backing vocals  
 Eddie Huang – backing vocals arrangement , backing vocals  
 LÜCY – backing vocals  
 LEE – backing vocals 

Technical

 Chen Yilin – recording 
 AJ Chen – recording , mixing 
 Link Shan – recording 
 Thomas Chuang – recording , mixing 
 Yeh Yuhsuan – recording   
 Zen Chien – recording 
 Lin Shangpo – recording  
 Chief Wang – recording 
 SHENB – recording , mixing , assistant production  
 Yu Shihcheng – assistant record engineering 
 Lin Yuchien – assistant record engineering 
 Tseng Donghong – assistant record engineering 
 Peng Tengwei – assistant record engineering 
 Ziya Huang – mixing 
 Simon Li –  mixing 
 Lin Chengchung – mixing 
 Jerry Lin – mixing 
 Sun Chungshu – mastering 
 Gorden – assistant production

Charts
The following charts are for albums sold at each record shops or online music stores in Taiwan.

Weekly charts

Year-end charts

References

2021 debut albums

External links